King's was a federal electoral district in Prince Edward Island, Canada, that was represented in the House of Commons of Canada from 1896 to 1968.

History

This riding was created from King's County riding.

It was abolished in 1966 when it was merged into Cardigan riding.

It initially consisted of the town of Georgetown and other parts of the County of King's.

In 1903, it was redefined to consist of the whole of the County of King's.

Members of Parliament

Election results

See also 

 List of Canadian federal electoral districts
 Past Canadian electoral districts

External links 
 Riding history for King's (1892–1966) from the Library of Parliament

Former federal electoral districts of Prince Edward Island